The men's doubles tournament in tennis at the 2007 Pan American Games was played from July 23 to July 28.

Medals

Seeds

Draw

Finals

Top half

Bottom half

References
Results

Men's doubles